John Wayne Middleton (April 11, 1900 – November 3, 1986) was a Major League Baseball pitcher who played for one season. He pitched for the Cleveland Indians for two games during the 1922 Cleveland Indians season. Middleton was one of a group of players that Indians player-manager Tris Speaker sent in partway through the game on September 21, 1922 done as an opportunity for fans to see various minor league prospects.

References

External links

1900 births
1986 deaths
Cleveland Indians players
Hardin–Simmons Cowboys baseball players
Major League Baseball pitchers
Baseball players from Texas